Qaleh Tall (also Romanized as Qal‘eh Tall, Qal‘eh-e Tol, Qal‘eh-i-Tul, Qal’eh Tol, Qal‘eh-ye Tol, and Qal‘eh-ye Tūl; also known as Ghal‘eh Tal) is a city in the Central District of Bagh-e Malek County, Khuzestan Province, Iran.  At the 2006 census, its population was 8,604, in 1,704 families.

References

Populated places in Bagh-e Malek County

Cities in Khuzestan Province

tr:Seydun